Osakis can refer to a community in the United States:

 Osakis, Minnesota
 Osakis Township, Douglas County, Minnesota